Carbonate minerals are those minerals containing the carbonate ion, .

Carbonate divisions

Anhydrous carbonates

Calcite group: trigonal 
Calcite CaCO3
Gaspéite (Ni,Mg,Fe2+)CO3
Magnesite MgCO3
Otavite CdCO3
Rhodochrosite MnCO3
Siderite FeCO3
Smithsonite ZnCO3
Spherocobaltite CoCO3
Aragonite group: orthorhombic
Aragonite CaCO3
Cerussite PbCO3
Strontianite SrCO3
Witherite BaCO3
Rutherfordine UO2CO3
Natrite Na2CO3

Anhydrous carbonates with compound formulas

Dolomite group: trigonal
Ankerite CaFe(CO3)2
Dolomite CaMg(CO3)2
Huntite Mg3Ca(CO3)4
Minrecordite CaZn(CO3)2
Barytocalcite BaCa(CO3)2

Carbonates with hydroxyl or halogen

Carbonate with hydroxide: monoclinic
Azurite Cu3(CO3)2(OH)2
Hydrocerussite Pb3(CO3)2(OH)2
Malachite Cu2CO3(OH)2
Rosasite (Cu,Zn)2CO3(OH)2
Phosgenite Pb2(CO3)Cl2
Hydrozincite Zn5(CO3)2(OH)6
Aurichalcite (Zn,Cu)5(CO3)2(OH)6

Hydrated carbonates
Hydromagnesite Mg5(CO3)4(OH)2.4H2O
Ikaite CaCO3·6(H2O)
Lansfordite MgCO3·5(H2O)
Monohydrocalcite CaCO3·H2O
Natron Na2CO3·10(H2O)
Zellerite Ca(UO2)(CO3)2·5(H2O)

The carbonate class in both the Dana and the Strunz classification systems include the nitrates.

Nickel–Strunz classification -05- carbonates 

IMA-CNMNC proposes a new hierarchical scheme (Mills et al., 2009). This list uses the classification of Nickel–Strunz (mindat.org, 10 ed, pending publication).

Abbreviations:
"*" – discredited (IMA/CNMNC status).
"?" – questionable/doubtful (IMA/CNMNC status).
"REE" – Rare-earth element (Sc, Y, La, Ce, Pr, Nd, Pm, Sm, Eu, Gd, Tb, Dy, Ho, Er, Tm, Yb, Lu)
"PGE" – Platinum-group element (Ru, Rh, Pd, Os, Ir, Pt)
03.C Aluminofluorides, 06 Borates, 08 Vanadates (04.H V[5,6] Vanadates), 09 Silicates:
Neso: insular (from Greek νησος nēsos, island)
Soro: grouping (from Greek σωροῦ sōros, heap, mound (especially of corn))
Cyclo: ring
Ino: chain (from Greek ις [genitive: ινος inos], fibre)  
Phyllo: sheet (from Greek φύλλον phyllon, leaf) 
Tekto: three-dimensional framework
Nickel–Strunz code scheme: NN.XY.##x
NN: Nickel–Strunz mineral class number
X: Nickel–Strunz mineral division letter
Y: Nickel–Strunz mineral family letter
##x: Nickel–Strunz mineral/group number, x add-on letter

Class: carbonates 
 05.A Carbonates without additional anions, without H2O
 05.AA Alkali carbonates: 05 Zabuyelite; 10 Gregoryite, 10 Natrite; 15 Nahcolite, 20 Kalicinite, 25 Teschemacherite, 30 Wegscheiderite
 05.AB Alkali-earth (and other M2+) carbonates: 05 Calcite, 05 Gaspeite, 05 Magnesite, 05 Rhodochrosite, 05 Otavite, 05 Spherocobaltite, 05 Siderite, 05 Smithsonite; 10 Ankerite, 10 Dolomite, 10 Kutnohorite, 10 Minrecordite; 15 Cerussite, 15 Aragonite, 15 Strontianite, 15 Witherite; 20 Vaterite, 25 Huntite, 30 Norsethite, 35 Alstonite; 40 Olekminskite, 40 Paralstonite; 45 Barytocalcite, 50 Carbocernaite, 55 Benstonite, 60 Juangodoyite
 05.AC Alkali and alkali-earth carbonates: 05 Eitelite, 10 Nyerereite, 10 Natrofairchildite, 10 Zemkorite; 15 Butschliite, 20 Fairchildite, 25 Shortite; 30 Sanromanite, 30 Burbankite, 30 Calcioburbankite, 30 Khanneshite
 05.AD With rare-earth elements (REE): 05 Sahamalite-(Ce); 15 Rémondite-(Ce), 15 Petersenite-(Ce), 15 Rémondite-(La); 20 Paratooite-(La)
 05.B Carbonates with additional anions, without H2O 
 05.BA With Cu, Co, Ni, Zn, Mg, Mn: 05 Azurite, 10 Chukanovite, 10 Malachite, 10 Georgeite, 10 Pokrovskite, 10 Nullaginite, 10 Glaukosphaerite, 10 Mcguinnessite, 10 Kolwezite, 10 Rosasite, 10 Zincrosasite; 15 Aurichalcite, 15 Hydrozincite; 20 Holdawayite, 25 Defernite; 30 Loseyite, 30 Sclarite
 05.BB With alkalies, etc.: 05 Barentsite, 10 Dawsonite, 15 Tunisite, 20 Sabinaite
 05.BC With alkali-earth cations: 05 Brenkite, 10 Rouvilleite, 15 Podlesnoite
 05.BD With rare-earth elements (REE): 05 Cordylite-(Ce), 05 Lukechangite-(Ce); 10 Kukharenkoite-(La), 10 Kukharenkoite-(Ce), 10 Zhonghuacerite-(Ce); 15 Cebaite-(Nd), 15 Cebaite-(Ce); 20a Bastnasite-(Ce), 20a Bastnasite-(La), 20a Bastnasite-(Y), 20a Hydroxylbastnasite-(Ce), 20a Hydroxylbastnasite-(La), 20a Hydroxylbastnasite-(Nd), 20a Thorbastnasite, 20b Parisite-(Nd), 20b Parisite-(Ce), 20c Synchysite-(Ce), 20c Synchysite-(Nd), 20c Synchysite-(Y), 20d Rontgenite-(Ce); 25 Horvathite-(Y), 30 Qaqarssukite-(Ce), 35 Huanghoite-(Ce)
 05.BE With Pb, Bi: 05 Shannonite, 10 Hydrocerussite, 15 Plumbonacrite, 20 Phosgenite, 25 Bismutite, 30 Kettnerite, 35 Beyerite 
 05.BF With (Cl), SO4, PO4, TeO3: 05 Northupite, 05 Ferrotychite, 05 Manganotychite, 05 Tychite; 10 Bonshtedtite, 10 Crawfordite, 10 Bradleyitev, 10 Sidorenkite, 15 Daqingshanite-(Ce), 20 Reederite-(Y), 25 Mineevite-(Y), 30 Brianyoungite, 35 Philolithite; 40 Macphersonitev, 40 Susannite, 40 Leadhillite 
 05.C Carbonates without additional anions, with H2O
 05.CA With medium-sized cations: 05 Nesquehonite, 10 Lansfordite, 15 Barringtonite, 20 Hellyerite
 05.CB With large cations (alkali and alkali-earth carbonates): 05 Thermonatrite, 10 Natron, 15 Trona, 20 Monohydrocalcite, 25 Ikaite, 30 Pirssonite, 35 Gaylussite, 40 Chalconatronite, 45 Baylissite, 50 Tuliokite
 05.CC With rare-earth elements (REE): 05 Donnayite-(Y), 05 Mckelveyite-(Nd)*, 05 Mckelveyite-(Y), 05 Weloganite; 10 Tengerite-(Y), 15 Lokkaite-(Y); 20 Shomiokite-(Y), 20 IMA2008-069; 25 Calkinsite-(Ce), 25 Lanthanite-(Ce), 25 Lanthanite-(La), 25 Lanthanite-(Nd); 30 Adamsite-(Y), 35 Decrespignyite-(Y), 40 Galgenbergite-(Ce), 45 Ewaldite, 50 Kimuraite-(Y)
 05.D Carbonates with additional anions, with H2O
 05.DA With medium-sized cations: 05 Dypingite, 05 Giorgiosite, 05 Hydromagnesite, 05 Widgiemoolthalite; 10 Artinite, 10 Chlorartinite; 15 Otwayite, 20 Kambaldaite, 25 Callaghanite, 30 Claraite; 35 Hydroscarbroite, 35 Scarbroite; 40 Charmarite-3T, 40 Charmarite-2H, 40 Caresite, 40 Quintinite-2H, 40 Quintinite-3T; 45 Brugnatellite, 45 Barbertonite, 45 Chlormagaluminite, 45 Zaccagnaite, 45 Manasseite, 45 Sjogrenite; 50 Desautelsite, 50 Comblainite, 50 Hydrotalcite, 50 Pyroaurite, 50 Reevesite, 50 Stichtite, 50 Takovite; 55 Coalingite, 60 Karchevskyite, 65 Indigirite, 70 Zaratite
 05.DB With large and medium-sized cations: 05 Alumohydrocalcite, 05 Para-alumohydrocalcite, 05 Nasledovite; 10 Dresserite, 10 Dundasite, 10 Strontiodresserite, 10 Petterdite, 10 Kochsandorite; 15 Hydrodresserite, 20 Schuilingite-(Nd), 25 Sergeevite, 30 Szymanskiite, 35 Montroyalite
 05.DC With large cations: 05 Ancylite-(Ce), 05 Ancylite-(La), 05 Gysinite-(Nd), 05 Calcioancylite-(Ce), 05 Calcioancylite-(Nd), 05 Kozoite-(La), 05 Kozoite-(Nd); 10 Kamphaugite-(Y), 15 Sheldrickite, 20 Thomasclarkite-(Y), 25 Peterbaylissite, 30 Clearcreekite, 35 Niveolanite
 05.E Uranyl carbonates
 05.EA UO2:CO3 > 1:1: 10 Urancalcarite, 15 Wyartite, 20 Oswaldpeetersite, 25 Roubaultite, 30 Kamotoite-(Y), 35 Sharpite
 05.EB UO2:CO3 = 1:1: 05 Rutherfordine, 10 Blatonite, 15 Joliotite, 20 Bijvoetite-(Y)
 05.EC UO2:CO3 < 1:1 - 1:2: 05 Fontanite; 10 Metazellerite, 10 Zellerite
 05.ED UO2:CO3 = 1:3: 05 Bayleyite, 10 Swartzite, 15 Albrechtschraufite, 20 Liebigite, 25 Rabbittite, 30 Andersonite, 35 Grimselite, 40 Widenmannite, 45 Znucalite, 50 Cejkaite
 05.EE UO2:CO3 = 1:4: 05 Voglite, 10 Shabaite-(Nd)
 05.EF UO2:CO3 = 1:5: 05 Astrocyanite-(Ce)
 05.EG With SO4 or SiO4: 05 Schrockingerite, 10 Lepersonnite-(Gd)

Class: nitrates 
 05.N Nitrates
 05.NA Without OH or H2O: 05 Nitratine, 10 Niter, 15 Gwihabaite, 20 Nitrobarite
 05.NB With OH: 05 Gerhardtite, 05 Rouaite
 05.NC With H2O: 05 Nitromagnesite, 10 Nitrocalcite
 05.ND With OH (etc.) and H2O: 05 Likasite, 10 Mbobomkulite, 15 Hydrombobomkulite, 20 Sveite

References

 Hurlbut, Cornelius S.; Klein, Cornelis, 1985, Manual of Mineralogy, 20th ed.,

External links

 

ja:炭酸塩#炭酸塩鉱物